The Neuseen Classics – Rund um die Braunkohle was a single-day road bicycle race held annually in Leipzig, Germany.

Winners

External links
 Official website 

UCI Europe Tour races
Cycle races in Germany
Recurring sporting events established in 2004
2004 establishments in Germany
Sport in Saxony
Defunct cycling races in Germany
2012 disestablishments in Germany
Recurring sporting events disestablished in 2012